Alison Croggon (born 1962) is a contemporary Australian poet, playwright, fantasy novelist, and librettist.

Life and career
Born in the Transvaal, South Africa, Alison Croggon's family moved to England before settling in Australia, first in Ballarat then Melbourne. She has worked as a journalist for the Sydney Morning Herald. Her first volume of poetry, This is the Stone, won the Anne Elder Award and the Mary Gilmore Prize. Her novella Navigatio was highly commended in the 1995 The Australian/Vogel Literary Award. Four novels of the fantasy genre series Pellinor have been published. She also founded and edits the online writing magazine Masthead and writes theatre criticism.

Croggon has also written libretti for Michael Smetanin's operas Gauguin: A Synthetic Life and The Burrow, which premiered respectively at the 2000 Melbourne Festival and Perth Festival, produced by ChamberMade. In 2014, Iain Grandage (composer) and Croggon (librettist) collaborated to present The Riders, based on Tim Winton's novel The Riders. Its world premiere was in Melbourne.

Other poems by Croggon have been set to music by Smetanin, Christine McCombe, Margaret Legge-Wilkinson, and Andrée Greenwell. Her plays have been produced by the Melbourne Festival, The Red Shed Company (Adelaide) and ABC Radio.

She currently lives in Melbourne, Australia with her husband Daniel Keene and three children.

Awards and nominations
2009 Pascall Prize for Critical Writing for her blog Theatre Notes
2023 shortlisted for NSW Premier's Translation Prize for Duino Elegies

Works

Poetry
 
 
 
  excerpt

Memoir 

 Monsters: A reckoning. Scribe. 2021.

Novella

Fantasy novels

The Books of Pellinor

  (Published in the US as The Naming (Candlewick Press)
 
 
 
 (Cadvan's Story: Prequel to the Books of Pellinor)

Standalone

Libretti
 (1995) The Burrow, 
 (2000) Gauguin (a synthetic life)
 (2014) The Riders

Plays 
 Monologues for an Apocalypse (2000)
 Blue (2001)
 My Dearworthy Darling (2019)

References

External links

Theatre Notes Weblog
Recordings of poems at Poetry Archive
Interview

1962 births
20th-century Australian journalists
20th-century Australian non-fiction writers
20th-century Australian novelists
20th-century Australian poets
20th-century Australian women writers
20th-century essayists
21st-century Australian journalists
21st-century Australian non-fiction writers
21st-century Australian novelists
21st-century Australian poets
21st-century Australian women writers
21st-century essayists
21st-century memoirists
Australian activists
Australian essayists
Australian fantasy writers
Australian memoirists
Australian opera librettists
Australian social commentators
Australian speculative fiction writers
Australian theatre critics
Women theatre critics
Australian women bloggers
Australian women dramatists and playwrights
Australian women journalists
Australian women novelists
Australian women poets
Bloggers from Melbourne
Literacy and society theorists
Living people
Meanjin people
Media critics
Women opera librettists
Women science fiction and fantasy writers
Writers about activism and social change